David Gaunt (born 1944 in London) is a historian and professor at Södertörn University's Centre for Baltic and East European Studies and Member of Academia Europaea. Gaunt's book about the Assyrian genocide, Massacres, Resistance, Protectors, was described as "the most important book that has been published in recent years".

Works 

"The property and kin relationships of retired farmers in northern and central Europe" in Family forms in historic Europe, 1983

"The Ottoman Treatment of the Assyrians" In: A question of genocide : Armenians and Turks at the end of the Ottoman Empire / [ed] Ronald Grigor Suny, Fatma Müge Goçek, Norman M. Naimark, Oxford: Oxford University Press, 2011, p. 244-259

"Failed Identity and the Assyrian Genocide" In: Shatterzone of Empires: Coexistence and Violence in the German, Habsburg, Russian and Ottoman Borderlands / [ed] Omer Bartov & Eric D. Weitz, Bloomington, Indiana: Indiana University Press, 2013, 1, p. 317-333
"The Culture of Inter-Religious Violence in Anatolian Borderlands in the Late Ottoman Empire" In: Gewaltgemeinschaften: Von der Spätantike bis ins 20. Jahrhundert / [ed] Winfried Speitkamp, Göttingen: V&R Unipress, 2013, 1, p. 251-274

"The Long Assyrian Genocide" in Collective and State Violence in Turkey: The Construction of a National Identity from Empire to Nation-State 2020

References 

1944 births
Living people
Academic staff of Södertörn University
Members of Academia Europaea
20th-century Swedish historians
People from London
British emigrants to Sweden
Uppsala University alumni
21st-century Swedish historians